Léon Bourjade (25 May 1889 – 22 October 1924), born Jean-Pierre Léon Bourjade, was a leading French fighter pilot in World War I, notable for being his country's leading balloon-busting ace. He interrupted his theological studies to fight in World War I; post-war, he completed his studies and spent the few remaining years of his life as a missionary in what is now Papua New Guinea.

Early life and service
Bourjade was born at Montauban, France on 25 May 1889. It was his childhood dream to become a missionary priest. His studies to that end were interrupted by his compulsory military service for France. Upon his release from service, he resumed his studies, but in Switzerland.

In 1914 he returned to France to enter the army. He served as an enlisted artilleryman for nearly three years. His initial service was with 23eme Regiment d'Artillerie for the First Battle of the Marne. In 1915, he transferred to the 125e Brigade de Bombardiers, a mortar brigade. While serving with this unit, he was commissioned into officers' ranks as a Sous lieutenant.

Aviation service
He transferred to aviation in 1917, receiving his Military Pilot's Brevet on 17 June. He went on to advanced training at Pau. From there, he joined Escadrille N152; he was eventually to become its highest-scoring pilot. Originally, he flew a Nieuport with his own personal touch - a Sacré-Coeur banner streaming from his headrest.

He opened his list on 27 March 1918, after his squadron re-equipped, flying his newly acquired Spad XIII to shoot down a German observation balloon. With one exception, all of his air victories were to be over balloons.

Bourjade scored another victory in April and two in May. He then went off combat duty for three weeks to attend gunnery school. After his return, he became an ace on 25 June with the first of his four scores for the month. His seventh, on 29 June 1918, was over a Fokker D VII, his only victory not involving a balloon.

In the remaining four months of his career, his victories totaled seven in July, one in August, four in September, and eight in October. Beginning in August 1918, he made it a practice to coordinate his attack on the balloons with other French pilots. August was the month he spent largely out of action, with three weeks in the hospital and eight days leave spent with his parents.
 
He ended the war with a victory list of 27 balloons and one aircraft shot down, with a second airplane as an unconfirmed victory. It was a total that left him second only to Willy Coppens of Belgium as a balloon buster.

He was awarded a Chevalier of the Legion d'Honneur. In 1920, he was raised to Officier in the Legion.

Post war

On 26 July 1921 he was finally ordained as a priest, taking ship to New Guinea that November to join the Catholic Sacred Heart Mission on Yule Island, in what was then the Australian Territory of Papua (British New Guinea). Bourjade died in 1924, of hematuria (perhaps the result of an overdose of quinine against malaria).  He was 35 years old.

French warships visiting Yule Island would fire salutes in his honour.

Citations for Decorations

Légion d'Honneur (Chevalier)

"Officer pilot of uncommon bravery and audacity. After brilliant conduct in the artillery, he has proven the highest qualities of courage by attacking numerous balloons and has shot down four. Four citations." Chevalier de la Légion d'Honneur citation, June 5, 1918

Légion d'Honneur (Officier)

"Officer of the highest value; pursuit pilot of heroic bravery. Specialist in the attack of enemy observation balloons, has rendered brilliant service, proven by the numbers of his victories and by magnificent personal examples. Fourteen citations. One wound." Officier de la Légion d'Honneur citation, June 16, 1920.

Endnotes

References
 Footsteps in the sea: Christianity in Oceania to World War II. John Garrett, University of the South Pacific. Institute of Pacific Studies. 1992. , .

 Over the Front: The Complete Record of the Fighter Aces and Units of the United States and French Air Services, 1914–1918. Norman Franks, Frank Bailey. Grub Street Publishing .

 SPAD XII/XIII Aces of World War I.  Jon Guttman, Harry Dempsey. Osprey Publishing, 2002. , .

External links
 As 14-18 website http://www.as14-18.net/Bourjade Accessed 6 February 2019

Military file on French DoD website Accessed 31 July 2020.

 The Aerodrome website http://www.theaerodrome.com/aces/france/bourjade.php Accessed 1 September 2008.

  Century of Flight website http://www.century-of-flight.freeola.com/Aviation%20history/airplane%20at%20war/upload3/Leon%20Bourjade.htm  Accessed 1 September 2008.

1889 births
1924 deaths
Officiers of the Légion d'honneur
French World War I flying aces
Recipients of the Croix de Guerre (France)
Christian medical missionaries
Roman Catholic missionaries in Papua New Guinea
Deaths from leprosy
French expatriates in Papua New Guinea
Infectious disease deaths in Papua New Guinea
French Roman Catholic missionaries
Drug-related deaths in Papua New Guinea